Benjamin Stephenson "Steve" Goss (November 7, 1949 – October 26, 2015) was an American politician. He served two terms (January 2007 – December 2010) as a Democratic member of the North Carolina Senate. He represented the 45th Senate district, including constituents in Alexander, Ashe, Watauga, and Wilkes counties. He was defeated for re-election in 2010 by Republican Dan Soucek.

Goss was an ordained Southern Baptist minister and resided in Boone, North Carolina. He has a B.S. in Social Science with a Minor in Education from Appalachian State University and a Master of Divinity (M.Div.) from Southeastern Baptist Theological Seminary. He died at his home in Boone from cancer on October 26, 2015 at the age of 65.

References

External links
Official legislative page
SenatorSteveGoss.com: Goss campaign site

Democratic Party North Carolina state senators
1949 births
2015 deaths
People from Ashe County, North Carolina
People from Boone, North Carolina
Appalachian State University alumni
Southern Baptist ministers
Southern Baptist Theological Seminary alumni
21st-century American politicians
Baptists from North Carolina